The NER Class V was a class of twenty steam locomotives of the 4-4-2 wheel arrangement. They were designed by Wilson Worsdell for the North Eastern Railway (NER) as express passenger locomotives.

History
In the early part of the twentieth century, the main express passenger services of the NER were mostly being hauled by 4-4-0 locomotives. The newest of these were Class R, thirty of which were built between 1899 and 1901; they were supplemented by the five 4-6-0 locomotives of Class S1 built in 1900–01. Train weights were increasing, and it was clear that a better design was required. The southern partner of the NER in the East Coast route was the Great Northern Railway, which since 1898 had built a number of 4-4-2 locomotives (GNR Class C1) which proved capable of hauling the heaviest expresses of the period; and so Worsdell decided upon the same wheel arrangement for a new class for the NER.

The first ten, built at Gateshead in 1903–04, were assigned Class V; the second ten, built at Darlington in 1910 had some detail differences and were assigned Class V/09 (or V1 according to some sources), the /09 suffix referring to the year that the design was prepared.

Class V were given numbers scattered between 295 and 1794 which were blank at the time. Class V/09 were given numbers 696–705. All twenty passed to the London and North Eastern Railway (LNER) at the 1923 Grouping, becoming LNER Class C6, and they retained their numbers on the LNER.

By the end of 1920, most of the class were allocated to the two main Newcastle-area depots, ten at Gateshead and eight at Heaton; but the remaining two were at York. By Grouping, three had been reallocated to Tweedmouth, and York had gained a further two, leaving seven at Gateshead and six at Heaton. The York engines were mainly used between York and Newcastle; those at Tweedmouth worked between Berwick and Newcastle; but the Gateshead and Heaton engines could be used between Newcastle and York, Newcastle and Leeds, or between Newcastle and Edinburgh.

Withdrawal
Withdrawal commenced with no. 532 in January 1943; later that year, the nineteen surviving locomotives were allotted new numbers 2930–48, but by the time the scheme was published, no. 649 (which had been allotted no. 2930) had also been withdrawn, so the new series as published was 2931–48. The actual renumbering did not commence until 1946, by which time several more had been withdrawn, and only seven were ultimately renumbered. Two, LNER nos. 2933 and 2937, remained in service at nationalisation, but both were withdrawn in March 1948 before the British Railways renumbering was prepared.

Fleet list

Notes

References

External links
 The Worsdell C6 (NER Classes V & V/09) 4-4-2 Atlantics LNER Encyclopedia

V
4-4-2 locomotives
Railway locomotives introduced in 1903
Scrapped locomotives
Standard gauge steam locomotives of Great Britain
Passenger locomotives